These regulations are a United Kingdom Statutory Instrument regulating various activities relating to the safety of installations and appliances using Natural gas and Liquefied Petroleum Gas (LPG).

Note that there is no reference in the UK law or in HSE to "Landlord's gas safety certificate" - only to having a "record" of an "annual gas safety check". However the following is generally required by *UK law.

The regulations cover various aspects of the supply and use of gas, and qualifications and duties of people involved with doing so. Provisions of the regulations with which the public is most familiar are:
 the duties of landlords to ensure the safety of gas installations and appliances in rented accommodation, attested by a Landlord's Gas Safety Certificate which must be obtained at least annually and a copy given to tenants.
 the qualifications required of people working on gas installations and appliances.
The latter requires those carrying out gas work to be "competent" and also that if they are doing gas work as an employee or self-employed person they should be "a member of a class of persons approved for the time being by the Health and Safety Executive". The "class of persons" currently means those registered with Gas Safe Register.

 Gas Safety (Installation and Use) Regulations 1998 S.I. 1998/2451

References 

1998 in British law
Carbon monoxide
Health and safety in the United Kingdom
Natural gas industry in the United Kingdom
Natural gas safety
Occupational safety and health law
Statutory Instruments of the United Kingdom